The 2012–13 Canberra Cavalry season will be the third season for the team. As was the case for the previous season, the Cavalry will compete in the Australian Baseball League (ABL) with the other five foundation teams, and will again play its home games at Narrabundah Ballpark.

Offseason

Regular season

Standings

Record vs opponents

Game log 

|- bgcolor=#ffbbbb
| 1
| 2 November
| 
| 2–3
| T. Van Steensel
| E. Massingham
| M. Williams
| 1,812
| 0-1
| 
|- bgcolor=#ffbbbb
| 2
| 3 November (DH 1)
| 
| 1–2
| V. Harris
| K. Perkins
| M. Williams
| -
| 0-2
| 
|- bgcolor=#bbffbb
| 3
| 3 November (DH 2)
| 
| 2–1
| D. Loggins
| C. Anderson
| S. Toler
| 1,291
| 1-2
| 
|- bgcolor=#bbffbb
| 4
| 16 November
| @ 
| 3–2
| B. Grening 
| J. Staatz
| S. Toler
| 537
| 2-2
| 
|- bgcolor=#ffbbbb
| 5
| 17 November (DH 1)
| @ 
| 0–1
| C. Smith
| R. Dickmann
| 
| 613
| 2-3
| 
|- bgcolor=#bbbbbb
| 6
| 17 November (DH 2)
| @ 
| 1–6 (after 3 innings)
| 
| 
| 
| 
| 
| 
|- bgcolor=#ffbbbb
| 7
| 23 November
| 
| 3–5
| Z. Arneson
| D. Loggins
| J. Hussey
| 1,155
| 2-4
| 
|- bgcolor=#bbffbb
| 8
| 24 November (DH 1)
| 
| 10–9
| K. Perkins
| H. Koishi
| S. Tole
|  
| 3-4
| 
|- bgcolor=#bbffbb
| 9
| 24 November (DH 2)
| 
| 5–3
| M. Fujihara
| D. McGrath
| D. Loggins
| 1,503
| 4-4
| 
|- bgcolor=#ffbbbb
| 10
| 25 November
| 
| 7–8
| A. Blackley
| J. Holdzkom
| J. Hussey
| 980
| 4-5
| 
|- bgcolor=#bbffbb
| 11
| 30 November
| 
| 8–2
| B. Grening
| P. Mildren
| 
| 1,128 
| 5-5
| 
|-

|- bgcolor=#ffbbbb
| 12
| 1 December (DH 1)
| 
| 6–7
| R. Olson
| S. Kent
| A. Kittredge
| 
| 5-6
| 
|- bgcolor=#bbffbb
| 13
| 1 December (DH 2)
| 
| 6–3
| R. Dickmann
| D. Fidge
| S. Toler
| 1,112
| 6-6
| 
|- bgcolor=#bbffbb
| 14
| 2 December
| 
| 4–2
| E. Massingham
| D. Ruzic
| S. Toler
| 703
| 7-6
|  
|- bgcolor=#bbffbb
| 15
| 6 December
| @ 
| 2–1
| E. Massingham
| T. Van Steensel
| S. Toler
| 689
| 8-6
| 
|- bgcolor=#ffbbbb
| 16
| 7 December
| @ 
| 3–4
| C. Anderson
| R. Dickmann
| M. Williams
| 872
| 8-7
| 
|- bgcolor=#bbffbb
| 17
| 8 December
| @ 
| 6–2
| C. Motta
| T. Cox
| 
| 1,305
| 9-7
| 
|- bgcolor=#bbffbb
| 18
| 9 December
| @ 
| 7–6
| D. Loggins
| T. Van Steensel
| S. Toler
| 1,165
| 10-7
| 
|- bgcolor=#bbffbb
| 19
| 13 December
| @ 
| 9–1
| B. Grening
| K. Reese
| 
| 632
| 11-7
| 
|- bgcolor=#ffbbbb
| 20
| 14 December (DH 1)
| @ 
| 0–5
| H. Koishi
| R. Dickmann
| 
| 
| 11-8
| 
|- bgcolor=#bbffbb
| 21
| 14 December (DH 2)
| @ 
| 9–8
| S. Toler
| Y. Nakazaki
| 
| 1,136
| 12-8
| 
|- bgcolor=#bbffbb
| 22
| 15 December
| @ 
| 5–0
| J. Holdzkom
| S. Gibbons
| 
| 223 
| 13-8
| 
|-
| 23
| 20 December
| 
| –
| 
| 
| 
| 
| 
| 
|-
| 24
| 21 December
| 
| –
| 
| 
| 
| 
| 
| 
|-
| 25
| 22 December
| 
| –
| 
| 
| 
| 
| 
| 
|-
| 26
| 23 December
| 
| –
| 
| 
| 
| 
| 
| 
|-
| 27
| 28 December
| @ 
| –
| 
| 
| 
| 
| 
| 
|-
| 28
| 29 December
| @ 
| –
| 
| 
| 
| 
| 
| 
|-
| 29
| 30 December
| @ 
| –
| 
| 
| 
| 
| 
|
|-
| 30
| 31 December
| @ 
| –
| 
| 
| 
| 
| 
| 
|-

|-
| 31
| 3 January
| 
| –
| 
| 
| 
| 
| 
| 
|-
| 32
| 4 January
| 
| –
| 
| 
| 
| 
| 
| 
|-
| 33
| 5 January
| 
| –
| 
| 
| 
| 
| 
| 
|-
| 34
| 6 January
| 
| –
| 
| 
| 
| 
| 
| 
|-
| 35
| 11 January
| @ 
| –
| 
| 
| 
| 
| 
| 
|-
| 36
| 12 January (DH 1)
| @ 
| –
| 
| 
| 
| 
| 
| 
|-
| 37
| 12 January (DH 2)
| @ 
| –
| 
| 
| 
| 
| 
| 
|-
| 38
| 13 January
| @ 
| –
| 
| 
| 
| 
| 
| 
|-
| 39
| 17 January
| 
| –
| 
| 
| 
| 
| 
| 
|-
| 40
| 18 January
| 
| –
| 
| 
| 
| 
| 
| 
|-
| 41
| 19 January
| 
| –
| 
| 
| 
| 
| 
| 
|-
| 42
| 20 January
| 
| –
| 
| 
| 
| 
| 
| 
|-
| 43
| 24 January
| @ 
| –
| 
| 
| 
| 
| 
| 
|-
| 44
| 25 January
| @ 
| –
| 
| 
| 
| 
| 
| 
|-
| 45
| 26 January
| @ 
| –
| 
| 
| 
| 
| 
| 
|-
| 46
| 27 January
| @ 
| –
| 
| 
| 
| 
| 
| 
|-

Roster

References 

Canberra Cavalry
Canberra Cavalry